State Route 90 (SR 90) is a  state highway that travels southeast-to-northwest through portions of Atkinson, Coffee, Irwin, Ben Hill, Turner, Wilcox, Crisp, Dooly, Macon, Taylor, and Talbot counties in the south-central and west-central parts of the U.S. state of Georgia. The highway connects Willacoochee and Talbotton, via Ocilla, Fitzgerald, Cordele, Vienna and Oglethorpe.

The portion of the highway in Junction City, that is concurrent with SR 96, is part of the Fall Line Freeway, a divided highway that spans the state from Columbus to Augusta, and is also signed as SR 540. The Fall Line Freeway is planned to be incorporated into the proposed eastern extension of Interstate 14 (I-14), a freeway that is currently entirely within Central Texas and may be extended to Augusta.

Route description
SR 90 begins at an intersection with US 82/SR 520 (Main Street) in Willacoochee, within Atkinson County. It heads north-northeast on North Vickers Street and curves to the northwest. Just outside the town's limits, it meets the southern terminus of SR 149. It continues to the northwest and crosses into Coffee County. The highway doesn't intersect with any major highways in Coffee County, except for SR 158 on the Coffee–Irwin county line. In Irwin County, the highway passes through rural areas of the county and enters the southern part of Ocilla. There, it intersects US 129/SR 11 (South Irwin Avenue). The three routes head concurrent to the north, past Cumbee Park to an intersection with US 319/SR 32/SR 35 (4th Street). At this intersection, US 319 joins the concurrency, while SR 35 meets its northern terminus. They pass Irwin County Hospital and Ocilla Country Club. They also enters Ben Hill County just before passing Lake Beatrice. In the southern part of Fitzgerald, they meet SR 107 (Benjamin H. Hill Drive), which acts as a partial bypass of the city. At Central Avenue, US 319 departs to the east, concurrent with SR 107. At Sultana Drive, SR 90 splits off to the west. Then, at Dewey McGlamry Road, it turns to the north. The highway heads to the north-northwest and meets the southern terminus of SR 215, which takes on the "Dewey McGlamry Road" name, while SR 90 heads west on Salem Church Road. The route intersects the southern terminus of SR 233 (Sundew Road) and curves to the southwest and crosses into Turner County before entering Rebecca. In town, it meets SR 112 (Ashley Street West). They run concurrent through town until SR 112 departs to the north on Sylvester Road, while SR 90 heads to the northwest on North Railroad Street. West-northwest of town is a concurrency with SR 159. This concurrency ends at the Turner–Wilcox county line. SR 90 heads west along the county line and briefly enters Wilcox County proper. After that, it enters Crisp County. On the southeastern edge of Cordele, it intersects the eastern terminus of SR 33 Connector (Rockhouse Road East). Approximately  later is the northern terminus of SR 300 (Georgia–Florida Parkway). Another mile later is US 280/SR 30 (16th Avenue East). The three highways head concurrent to the west, into the main part of town. Almost immediately is an interchange with Interstate 75 (I-75). In downtown is an intersection with US 41/SR 7 (7th Street South). Here, SR 90 turns north. The three routes enter Dooly County before entering Vienna. In town, it intersects SR 27 (Union Street). The two highways head concurrent to the west and split apart just before leaving town. SR 90 passes through Lilly before entering Byromville. In town, it meets SR 230 (Church Avenue). The two routes run concurrent through town, until SR 230 departs to the south on Davis Avenue. Farther to the northwest, the road crosses into Macon County. The road intersects SR 26/SR 224 (Spaulding Road). The two routes have a rief concurrency, until the Flint River Community Hospital, where SR 90 curves to the north-northeast, to an intersection with SR 49 (North Dooly Street). SR 49/SR 90 run concurrent over the Flint River, into Oglethorpe. They intersect SR 128. At this intersection, SR 49/SR 128 head south on Chatham Street, while SR 90/SR 128 head north on Sumter Street. Just before leaving town is the northern terminus of SR 128 Bypass (West Bypass). A little ways north of town, SR 90 departs to the northwest to the town of Ideal. Northwest of town, it enters Taylor County. It meets SR 127 just before entering Rupert. There, it begins a brief concurrency with US 19/SR 3. Less than  later, SR 127 joins the concurrency. The four routes run concurrent for just over 1 mile. Then, SR 90/SR 127 split off to the west-northwest. They have a concurrency with SR 137. In the town of Mauk, SR 127 splits off to the south. To the north-northwest, the road crosses into Talbot County. In Junction City, it meets SR 96/SR 540 (Fall Line Freeway), and they travel concurrently to a point just west of town. Northwest of town, in Talbotton, it meets SR 208 (Old Wire Road). The two roads begin a concurrency to the west. Then, they pass the Oak Hill Cemetery, before they meet an intersection with US 80/SR 22/SR 41 (Washington Avenue). At this intersection, SR 90 meets its western terminus, and SR 208 begins a concurrency with US 80/SR 22/SR 41 to the north.

The following portions of SR 90 are part of the National Highway System, a system of routes determined to be the most important for the nation's economy, mobility, and defense:
From the southern end of the US 280/SR 30 concurrency, in the southeastern part of Cordele, to a point on US 41/SR 7 north of the city, just south of the Crisp–Dooly county line.
The entire length of the SR 26 concurrency in Montezuma
The entire length of the US 19/SR 3 concurrency in the Rupert area
The entire length of the SR 96/SR 540 concurrency in Junction City

Major intersections

See also

References

External links

 
 Georgia Roads (Routes 81 - 100)

090
Transportation in Atkinson County, Georgia
Transportation in Coffee County, Georgia
Transportation in Irwin County, Georgia
Transportation in Ben Hill County, Georgia
Transportation in Turner County, Georgia
Transportation in Wilcox County, Georgia
Transportation in Crisp County, Georgia
Transportation in Dooly County, Georgia
Transportation in Macon County, Georgia
Transportation in Taylor County, Georgia
Transportation in Talbot County, Georgia
Fitzgerald, Georgia micropolitan area